The Au Naturale Tour was a co-headlining concert tour by Canadian rock band Barenaked Ladies and Canadian singer-songwriter Alanis Morissette. The tour promotes their albums, Everything to Everyone and So-Called Chaos. Over the course of a month, the tour played nearly 25 shows in North America.

Opening act
Nellie McKay

Setlist

Tour dates

References

2004 concert tours
Barenaked Ladies concert tours
Alanis Morissette concert tours
Co-headlining concert tours